"Wonderful One" is a popular song recorded by the Paul Whiteman Orchestra on January 25, 1923 in New York and was released as Victor 19019-B. The record reached no. 3 on the Billboard chart. The song was also recorded as "My Wonderful One".

Background
The music was written by Paul Whiteman and Ferde Grofé, the lyrics by Theodora Morse (also known as Dorothy Terris), based on a theme by movie director Marshall Neilan, "Adapted from a Theme by Marshall Neilan". The song was published in 1922 by Leo Feist in New York as a "Waltz Song" which was dedicated "To Julie".

The song is a well-known jazz and pop standard, recorded by many artists, including Gertrude Moody, Edward Miller, Martha Pryor, Helen Moretti, John McCormack who released it as Victor 961, and Pete Bontsema in 1923. Henry Burr recorded the song in 1924, Jan Garber in 1936 and Glenn Miller and his Orchestra in 1940. The Paul Whiteman Orchestra recorded the song three times, in an acoustical version in 1923, an electrical version in 1928, both released as Victor 78 singles, and in 1959 on the Grand Award LP album 33-412.

Movie appearances
"Wonderful One" appeared in the following movies: Agatha (1979), The Chump Champ (1950), Julia Misbehaves (1948), Little 'Tinker (1948), Margie (1946), Red Hot Riding Hood (1943), Sufferin' Cats (1943), Design for Scandal (1941), Strike Up the Band (1940), and Westward Passage (1932).

The song was also featured in the 1950 MGM movie To Please a Lady starring Clark Gable and Barbara Stanwyck.

The song was sampled in 1997 by the American hip hop group Psycho Realm in the song "Temporary Insanity" contained on their debut album The Psycho Realm.

Recordings
 Paul Whiteman and His Orchestra, 1922, original instrumental version on Victor
 Martha Pryor, 1923
 Edward Miller, 1923
 Gertrude Moody, 1923
 John McCormack, 1923
 Pete Bontsema, 1923
 Henry Burr, 1924
 Jan Garber, 1936
 Glenn Miller and His Orchestra, 1939, on RCA Bluebird
 Frances Langford
 Art Tatum
 The Chordettes, 1953
 Paul Weston and His Orchestra, 1953, instrumental version
 Ken Griffin, 1954, instrumental
 Mel Tormé, 1955
 The McGuire Sisters, 1956
 Tony Bennett, 1960, To My Wonderful One album
 David Whitfield, 1961
 Della Reese, 1963
 Jerry Vale, 1963
 George Sanders on the album Songs for the Lovely Lady
 Bent Fabric, 1964
 Doris Day, 1967
 Bill Kenny 
 Vera Lynn
 Woody Herman
 Helen Moretti
 Dave Frishberg
 Fred Hartley
 Floyd Dixon
 Mari Jones
 Ben Light on Tempo
 Barbara Cameron on King Records
 Elizabeth Spencer, 1923 on Edison Records
 Psycho Realm, 1997 sample

References

External links 
U.S. Library of Congress. National Jukebox. Paul Whiteman recording.
U.S. Library of Congress. National Jukebox. Henry Burr recording.
U.S. Library of Congress. National Jukebox. John McCormack recording.
The Interactive Tony Bennett Discography: Wonderful One.
Paul Whiteman and his Orchestra. Red Hot Jazz.

Songs with music by Paul Whiteman
Compositions by Ferde Grofé
Songs with lyrics by Theodora Morse
1922 songs
1920s jazz standards
Pop standards
Tony Bennett songs
Pop ballads